"The Triple Revolution" was an open memorandum sent to U.S. President Lyndon B. Johnson and other government figures on March 22, 1964. Drafted under the auspices of the Center for the Study of Democratic Institutions, it was signed by an array of noted social activists, professors, and technologists who identified themselves as the Ad Hoc Committee on the Triple Revolution. The chief initiator of the proposal was W. H. "Ping" Ferry, at that time a vice-president of CSDI, basing it in large part on the ideas of the futurist Robert Theobald.

Overview
The statement identified three revolutions underway in the world: the cybernation revolution of increasing automation; the weaponry revolution of mutually assured destruction; and the human rights revolution. It discussed primarily the cybernation revolution. The committee claimed that machines would usher in "a system of almost unlimited productive capacity" while continually reducing the number of manual laborers needed, and increasing the skill needed to work, thereby producing increasing levels of unemployment. It proposed that the government should ease this transformation through large-scale public works, low-cost housing, public transit, electrical power development, income redistribution, union representation for the unemployed, and government restraint on technology deployment.

Legacy

Martin Luther King Jr.'s final Sunday sermon, delivered six days before his April 1968 assassination, explicitly references the thesis of "The Triple Revolution":

In Harlan Ellison's 1967 anthology Dangerous Visions, Philip José Farmer's story "Riders of the Purple Wage" uses the Triple Revolution document as the premise of a future society, in which the "purple wage" of the title is a guaranteed income dole on which most of the population lives. At the 1968 World Science Fiction Convention in San Francisco, Farmer delivered a lengthy Guest of Honor speech in which he called for the founding of a grassroots activist organization called REAP which would work for implementation of the Ad Hoc Committee's recommendations.

Looking back on the proposal in his 2008 book, Daniel Bell wrote: 

In his 2015 book Rise of the Robots, Martin Ford claims The Triple Revolution's predictions of steady decline in future employment were not wrong, but rather premature. He cites "Seven Deadly Trends" that began in the 1970s-1980s and by the mid 2010s appeared set to continue:
 Stagnation in real wages 
 Decline in labor's share of national income in many countries (breakdown of Bowley's law), while corporate profits increased
 Declining labor force participation
 Diminishing job creation, lengthening jobless recoveries, and soaring long-term unemployment
 Rising inequality
 Declining incomes, and underemployment for recent college graduates
 Polarization and part-time jobs (middle-class jobs are disappearing, to be replaced by a small number of high-paying jobs and large number of low-paying jobs)
According to Ford, the 1960s were part of what in retrospect seems like a golden age for labor in the United States, when productivity and wages rose together in near lockstep, and unemployment was low. But after about 1980, wages began stagnating while productivity continued to rise. Labor's share of the economic output began to decline. Ford describes the role that automation and information technology play in these trends, and how new technologies including narrow AI threaten to destroy jobs faster than displaced workers can be retrained for new jobs, before automation takes the new jobs as well. This includes many job categories, such as in transportation, that were never threatened by automation before. According to a 2013 study, about 47% of US jobs are susceptible to automation.

Signatories

See also 
 Basic income
 Cybernetics
 Norbert Wiener
 Post-scarcity economy
 Technological unemployment

Bibliography 
Perrucci, Robert, and Pilisuk, Marc [editors], "The Triple Revolution: social problems in depth", Boston: Little Brown & Co., 1968.

References

External links 

Text of the Triple Revolution statement
"The Triple Revolution." 1964.Santa Barbara, California: The Ad Hoc Committee on the Triple Revolution, 15 pp. (Linus Pauling, with 34 co-authors) page image version

1964 in economics
1964 in the United States
Automation
Nuclear proliferation
Revolutions by type
Socialism
Presidency of Lyndon B. Johnson